The Gorbeia Natural Park is the largest in the Basque Country, Spain. The park is located in the municipalities of Orozko, Zeberio and Zeanuri in Biscay and Zigoitia, Zuia and Urkabustaiz in Álava. The park was established by decree of the Basque Government in 1994.

Geography

The park is cenetered on mount Gorbeia and the massif of the same name. This has made it one of the most emblematic summits of the Basque Country.

References

External links
 
 
 

1994 establishments in the Basque Country (autonomous community)
Natura 2000 in the Basque Country (autonomous community)
Natural parks of Spain
Protected areas established in 1994
Protected areas of the Basque Country (autonomous community)